Rabbit Seasoning is a 1952 Warner Bros. Merrie Melodies cartoon directed by Chuck Jones. Released on September 20, 1952, the short stars Bugs Bunny, Daffy Duck and Elmer Fudd.

It is the sequel to the previous year's Rabbit Fire, and the second in the "hunting trilogy" directed by Jones and written by Michael Maltese (the only major difference in format between them is that Rabbit Fire takes place during the spring, while Rabbit Seasoning takes place in the autumn. The third cartoon, Duck! Rabbit, Duck!, takes place in the winter). The short was produced by Edward Selzer for Warner Bros. Cartoons, Inc., and is the first WB cartoon on which layout artist Maurice Noble received credit.

It is considered to be among Jones' best and most important films. In Jerry Beck's 1994 book The 50 Greatest Cartoons, Rabbit Seasoning is listed at number 30.

Plot
The cartoon opens showing several signs posted throughout the forest indicating that it is rabbit season.  It is revealed that Daffy Duck is the one putting them up, and he is shown stamping the ground with fake rabbit tracks leading to Bugs' hole. Daffy states that while he knows what he is doing is unfair, he has to have some fun "and besides, it's really duck season."

Elmer Fudd then appears and notices the rabbit tracks. He pokes his gun into the hole, threatens to blast Bugs if he does not come out, and then follows through on his threat. Bugs Bunny, however, has been watching from a hole a few feet away and wanders over to Elmer to begin a conversation with him about rabbit season. When Elmer fails to realize that Bugs is a rabbit, Daffy is angered by this and emerges from his hiding spot to point out that Bugs is a rabbit, which the latter confirms, asking if Elmer would prefer to shoot him now or wait until he gets home. Daffy passionately shouts for the first option and Bugs undermines him, "You keep out of this! He doesn't have to shoot you now!" Daffy sharply asserts, "He does so have to shoot me now!" and demands that Elmer do so. Elmer looks confused for a few seconds, but complies as Daffy sticks his tongue out at Bugs. The shot dislocates his beak to the back of his head and Daffy replaces his beak before requesting to run through again what they just said. Bugs agrees to, and upon reaching Bugs' word swap, Daffy calls him out on "pronoun trouble", saying "It's not 'he doesn't have to shoot you now.' It's 'he doesn't have to shoot me now.'  WELL, I SAY HE DOES HAVE TO SHOOT ME NOW!" Subsequently, Daffy commands Elmer to shoot him again, which he does. Daffy fixes his beak again and is about to rant at Bugs before realizing that he may fall into the same trap once more. He decides to speak to Elmer instead, confirming that Elmer is a hunter and that it is rabbit season. Bugs interjects, asking what Elmer would do if Daffy was a rabbit. Daffy repeats the question forcefully, and has enough time to realize what he said (looking towards the camera and meekly saying "Not again") before Elmer shoots him. Daffy fixes his bill once more and laughs sarcastically at Bugs for his trick.

At that point Elmer grows impatient and begins firing at them both. They hide together in Bugs' hole, and Daffy checks to see if the hunter is gone at Bugs' request. Daffy is shot again, and in a daze rejects Bugs' suggestion of being a decoy, whereupon the rabbit dresses up as a woman (wearing a Lana Turner-style sweater). He manages to fool Elmer briefly, but an annoyed Daffy demands that he reveal his identity out of sheer honesty. When Daffy antagonizes Bugs, asking if he has anything to say out of sheer honesty, "she" replies that she would love a duck dinner. A lovestruck Elmer shoots Daffy, who removes his beak by hand as he is shot and replaces it afterwards. The duck approaches the rabbit, briefly apologizes for suspecting him, then removes Bugs' wig to expose him and commands Elmer to shoot him. Bugs responds by asking, "Would you like to shoot him here or wait till you get home?" Daffy attempts to escape any more tricks by choosing the latter option, whereupon he joins Elmer on a walk to his cabin and is once again shot. Daffy walks back to Bugs, fixes his beak, and the cartoon ends with Daffy rebuking Bugs, "You're despicable."

Reception
Animator J. J. Sedelmaier writes, "Of director Chuck Jones' three "Shoot 'im now!" cartoons, Rabbit Seasoning has always been my favorite. Bugs, Daffy, and Elmer are so tightly defined as the characters we all know and love that they're almost parodies of themselves. Even though this short is the second of the series, it's still fresh and tight. What's also amazing is how it doesn't feel like a cartoon that's almost sixty years old. The timing of the cuts — Daffy's expression when Elmer says to Bugs that he "hasn't even seen a wabbit yet" — and the miscellaneous, eccentric W.C. Fields-like sound effects that seem to ooze out of Daffy are still cool today."

Cast
• Mel Blanc as Bugs Bunny and Daffy Duck

• Arthur Q. Bryan as Elmer Fudd (uncredited)

Home media
Rabbit Seasoning is available on the Looney Tunes Golden Collection: Volume 1 and Looney Tunes Platinum Collection: Volume 2. It is also available on the Salute To Chuck Jones VHS, the Warner Bros. Cartoons Golden Jubilee 24-Karat Collection: Elmer Fudd's Comedy Capers VHS, the Looney Tunes Collectors Edition: All-Stars VHS, and the Bugs Bunny: Winner By A Hare laserdisc.

References

External links

 
 

1952 films
1952 animated films
1952 short films
Merrie Melodies short films
Short films directed by Chuck Jones
Films about hunters
Animated films about rabbits and hares
Bugs Bunny films
Daffy Duck films
Elmer Fudd films
Fictional rivalries
1950s Warner Bros. animated short films
Films with screenplays by Michael Maltese
Films scored by Carl Stalling
1950s English-language films
Films set in forests